Benefis is a weekly one-hour talk show hosted by an Armenian presenter Avet Barseghyan, and airing on Yerevan-based Public Television company of Armenia. The show featured one-on-one interviews with notable residents of Armenia, their best performances, and interesting facts about their lives and creative paths. The talk-show aired every Sunday.

Episodes

Episode 1 
The episode aired on September 17, 2016. The talk-show was about Armenian singer-songwriter Hayko.

Episode 2 
The episode aired on September 24, 2016. The talk-show was about Armenian singer Silva Hakobyan.

Episode 3 
The episode aired on October 1, 2016. The talk-show was about Armenian singer Arame.

Episode 4 
The episode aired on October 8, 2016. The talk-show was about Armenian singer-songwriter Forsh.

Episode 5 
The episode aired on October 15, 2016. The talk-show was about Armenian singer Varduhi Vardanyan, who died in a car accident on Sevan - Martuni highway on October 15, 2006.

Episode 6 
The episode aired on October 22, 2016. The talk-show was about Armenian singer Razmik Amyan, his friend Hayko was also there.

Episode 7 
The episode aired on October 29, 2016. The talk-show was about Armenian singer Nune Yesayan.

Episode 8 
The episode aired on November 5, 2016. The talk-show was about Armenian singer Hasmik Karapetyan.

Episode 9 
The episode aired on November 19, 2016. The talk-show was about Armenian singer Erik.

Episode 10 
The episode aired on November 26, 2016. The talk-show was about Armenian singer Arminka.

Episode 11 
The episode aired on December 3, 2016. The talk-show was about Armenian singer Emmy.

Episode 12 
The episode aired on December 17, 2016. The talk-show was about Armenian singer SONA.

Episode 13 
The episode aired on December 24, 2016. The talk-show was about Armenian singer-songwriter Artur Grigoryan.

Episode 14 
The episode aired on February 11, 2017. The talk-show was about Armenian singer Arsen Safaryan.

Episode 15 
The episode aired on February 18, 2017. The talk-show was about Armenian singer Shushan Petrosyan.

Episode 16 
The episode aired on March 4, 2017. The talk-show was about Armenian singer Zaruhi Babayan.

Episode 17 
The episode aired on March 11, 2017. The talk-show was about Armenian singer-songwriter Arsen Grigoryan.

Episode 18 
The episode aired on March 25, 2017. The talk-show was about Armenian singer Christine Pepelyan.

Episode 19 
The episode aired on April 8, 2017. The talk-show was about Armenian singer and presenter Aram MP3.

Episode 20 
The episode aired on March 25, 2017. The talk-show was about Armenian singer-songwriter Edgar Gyanjumyan.

Episode 21 
The episode aired on April 8, 2017. The talk-show was about Armenian singer-songwriter Leyla Saribekyan.

Episode 22 
The episode aired on April 29, 2017. The talk-show was about Armenian singer Andre.

Episode 23 
The episode aired on May 20, 2017. The talk-show was about Armenian musician and actress Iveta Mukuchyan. The show was also featuring Gohar Gasparyan, Hayk Petrosyan.

Episode 24 
The episode aired on May 27, 2017. The talk-show was about Armenian singer Elvina Makaryan, who died in a car accident on Los Angeles on July 9, 2007.

Episode 25 
The episode aired on June 3, 2017. The talk-show was about Armenian singer Sona Shahgeldyan.

Episode 26 
The episode aired on June 24, 2017. The talk-show was about Armenian singer Arman Aghajanyan.

Episode 27 
The episode aired on July 1, 2017. The talk-show was about Armenian singer Ani Christy.

Episode 28 
The episode aired on July 8, 2017. The talk-show was about Armenian singer-songwriter Alla Levonyan.

Episode 29 
The last episode of the series aired on July 29, 2017 at 22:20 pm. The talk-show was about Armenian musician Avet Barseghyan (the presenter of the show). The episode was hosted by many Armenian well-known artists, such as Aram Mp3 and Gohar Gasparyan.

Awards and nominations

References

External links
 
 Benefis at the Internet Movie Database

Public Television Company of Armenia original programming
2010s Armenian television series
Armenian-language television shows
Armenian television talk shows